Te Pokiha Taranui (?–1901) was a notable New Zealand tribal leader and soldier. Of Māori descent, he identified with the Ngati Pikiao iwi. He was born in Rotorua, New Zealand.

References

1901 deaths
New Zealand military personnel
People from Rotorua
Ngāti Pikiao people
New Zealand Māori soldiers
Year of birth missing